

Brihtmær (died 1039) was a medieval Bishop of Lichfield.

Brihtmær was consecrated sometime before about 1026 and died in 1039. He was appointed by Cnut the Great, king of England, and nothing is known of why he was chosen or of his background.

Notes

Citations

References

External links
 

1039 deaths
Anglo-Saxon bishops of Lichfield
Year of birth unknown
11th-century English Roman Catholic bishops